Rrugicat që kërkonin diell is a 1975 Albanian action drama film directed by Saimir Kumbaro and written by Dhimitër Xhuvani.

Cast
Demir Hyskja
Rikard Larja
Ndrek Luca
Pandi Raidhi
Mevlan Shanaj

External links
 

1975 films
1975 drama films
1970s action drama films
Albanian-language films
Albanian black-and-white films

sq:Nga mesi i errësirës